Peggy Fletcher Stack is an American journalist, editor, and author. Stack has been the lead religion writer for The Salt Lake Tribune since 1991. She and five other journalists at the Salt Lake Tribune won the 2017 Pulitzer Prize for Local Reporting. She won the Cornell Award for Excellence in Religion Reporting—Mid-sized Newspapers from the Religious News Association in 2004, 2012, 2017, 2018, and 2022.

In 1975 Stack helped found Sunstone, an independent magazine of Mormon studies, and steered it for its first eleven years. She was the editor of Hastings Center Report from 1986 until 1991, when she was hired to start the "Faith" column in the Salt Lake Tribune. Stack is an advisor on religion to the Public Broadcasting Service, and has written two books.

Biography
Peggy Fletcher was raised in New Jersey, daughter of physicist Robert Chipman Fletcher and Rosemary Bennett, one of five girls and three boys. She was raised as a member of the Church of Jesus Christ of Latter-day Saints (LDS Church), with her father traveling and speaking as a member of the stake high council. She is a great-granddaughter of Heber J. Grant, an LDS Church president, a granddaughter of United States Senator from Utah, Wallace F. Bennett, and a granddaughter of American physicist Harvey Fletcher.

Fletcher initially attended Brigham Young University (BYU) in Provo, Utah, for a year, then transferred to the University of Utah, where she earned a BA in English literature. She then attended the Graduate Theological Union in Berkeley, California for two years, where she studied religious history. She then received a fellowship to work in the Church History Division of the LDS Church (then run by Leonard J. Arrington).

In 1975, following discussions with Scott Kenney and others, she helped found Sunstone, an independent magazine of Mormon studies. From 1978 to 1986, she was the third editor of Sunstone. During her time with the magazine, she helped turn around its finances, saving it from closing. She met Mike Stack when he volunteered as a photographer for Sunstone in 1984, and they married in October 1985.

The Stacks traveled in Africa for a year, then settled in New York City for five years, where she worked as the editor of the Hastings Center Report while her husband attended film school. They moved to Utah in 1991 when she was hired to be the religion writer for The Salt Lake Tribune, where much of her reporting has focused on the LDS Church. She started the "Faith" column after a discussion with Tribune editor Jay Shelledy. During her time there, she has met and interviewed the Dalai Lama, Desmond Tutu, and Gordon B. Hinckley, among others.

She won the 2004 Cornell Award for 'Excellence in Religion Reporting—Mid-sized Newspapers' from the Religion Newswriters Association in 2004, an award she also received in 2012, 2017, and 2018. The American Academy of Religion awarded her a first place Journalism Award in 2014 for her reporting on LDS missionaries who return home early from their volunteer missions. Along with five other reporters, she won a Pulitzer Prize in 2017 in the Local Reporting category for a series of stories about sexual assault victims at BYU.

Stack wrote a children's book about religion with artist Kathleen B. Petersen, entitled A World of Faith, published in 1998.

Publications
Books
 
 
Journal articles

Awards and honors
Stack has received and been nominated for multiple awards.

References

Further reading
 
 

American Latter Day Saint writers
American magazine editors
American women journalists
American women writers
Graduate Theological Union alumni
Latter Day Saints from New Jersey
Living people
Mormon studies
Pulitzer Prize for Local Reporting winners
Religion journalists
The Salt Lake Tribune people
Women magazine editors
Writers from Utah
Year of birth missing (living people)